Maggie & Bianca: Fashion Friends is an Italian live-action sitcom which premiered on Rai Gulp on August 29, 2016. The series was created by Iginio Straffi. It focuses on two roommates at the Fashion Academy of Milan: Maggie (Emanuela Rei), an American girl on a scholarship in Italy, and Bianca (Giorgia Boni), the daughter of an Italian fashion entrepreneur.

The series was originally developed as a 2011 television pilot starring the Californian musical duo Kalina and Kiana, titled "My American Friend." The pilot was co-produced by Rainbow SpA and Nickelodeon, which are both part of Viacom. Two Italian actresses, Emanuela Rei and Giorgia Boni, were recast as the two leads after the pilot was greenlit for a full series. As requested by RAI, the series was first performed in Italian and later dubbed into other languages. Three seasons of Maggie & Bianca were filmed at Cinecittà Studios in Rome.

Plot 
Maggie is an eccentric American girl from Portland who wins a scholarship to the Fashion Academy of Milan, a prestigious fashion school, on her sixteenth birthday. Bianca is the stylish and chic daughter of a powerful Italian fashion mogul. Bianca likes to sing but doesn't seem too motivated to join a band. The two girls meet and are thrown together as roommates at the Fashion Academy, but they get off to a rocky start as they have very different personalities and conflicting points of view. Over time, they come to understand one another. Together with three of their classmates, they form a band called the MoodBoards in order to pursue their musical dreams, while simultaneously continuing their study of fashion at the Academy. At the end of the first season, Maggie and Bianca discover that they are half-sisters, with the same father but different mothers. In the second season, Maggie's mother, who is a songwriter, comes to the Academy to teach, while members of the MoodBoards' rival band, CoolGhost, attend the Academy as new students.

Cast 

 Emanuela Rei as Maggie
 Giorgia Boni as Bianca
 Sergio Ruggeri as Jacques
 Luca Murphy as Quinn
 Federica Corti as Nausica
 Federico Pedroni as Leonardo (season 1)
 Tiffany Zhou as Yuki (seasons 1–2)
 Sergio Melone as Eduard
 Simone Lijoi as Professor Ferrari (season 1)
 Elia Nichols as Professor Tucker
 Alvaro Gradella as Headmaster Maffei
 Walter Leonardi as Uncle Max
 Clelia Piscitello as Dolores (seasons 1–2)
 Jody Cecchetto as Andrew (recurring, season 1; main, season 2)
 Paolo Fantoni as Felipe (recurring, season 1; main, seasons 2–3)
 Simona Di Bella as Susan (recurring, season 1; main, season 2)
 Giovanni Bussi as Professor Falques (seasons 2–3)
 Paolo Romano as Alberto (recurring, season 1; main, seasons 2–3)
 Greta Bellusci as Rachel (guest, season 1; main, seasons 2–3)
 Maria Luisa De Crescenzo as Eloise (season 3)

Episodes

Season 1 (2016)

Season 2 (2017)

Season 3 (2017) 
A third season aired in Italy between September 18 and December 2, 2017, and consisted of 26 episodes. The third season has not yet been released internationally on Netflix.

Production 
In September 2011, Rainbow and Nickelodeon (both part of Viacom) began filming a pilot episode for a new project in Tolentino, Marche. The pilot's working title was My American Friend and it starred Kiana and Kalina Campion, two singers from Los Angeles. According to a press tagline, it was meant to show "Italy seen through the eyes of two American teenagers". Filming continued in Milan and Rome, and in 2012, a 26-episode season of My American Friend was listed on Rainbow's content slate. Three years passed before production on a first season started. According to creator Iginio Straffi, his collaborators "had to throw away many scripts until they finally found the right key with a new formula." Kalina and Kiana Campion called the development process "extremely slow."

In July 2015, a full series was announced, with the Campions and Nickelodeon's American studio still attached to the project. Kalina and Kiana Campion decided to pass on the lead roles shortly before production started, and the American studio was no longer needed. The Campions would later return to write songs and make guest appearances for the completed series, but Italian actresses Emanuela Rei and Giorgia Boni were recast as the two lead characters. Rei and Boni were chosen out of around 400 auditions. At the request of RAI, which broadcast the show in Italy, the show was originally performed in Italian. Filming for the first season began in September 2015 at Cinecittà Studios in Rome, still under the working title My American Friend.

In April 2016, the show's new title, Maggie & Bianca: Fashion Friends, was revealed. The first season was screened at the Giffoni Film Festival in July 2016 and premiered on Rai Gulp on August 29, 2016. Filming on a third season of the series took place during summer 2017, and premiered in mid-September on Rai Gulp in Italy.

Broadcast 
Maggie & Bianca Fashion Friends was originally televised on Rai Gulp in Italy, where the first season aired from August 29 to September 28, 2016. The second season aired in Italy between January 11 and February 18, 2017, with the third season following between September 18 and December 2, 2017.

The series was broadcast throughout Europe, including in Greece and Portugal. Worldwide, the series' first two seasons were made available on Netflix, including in the United States, Canada, the United Kingdom, Ireland, Australia and New Zealand. The first season was released on Netflix on March 31, 2017, with the second season released on April 30, 2018.

References

External links 
 

2016 Italian television series debuts
2017 Italian television series endings
Italian comedy television series
Television series by Rainbow S.r.l.
Television series created by Iginio Straffi
Television shows set in Milan